Əhmədalılar (also, Akhmedallar and Akhmedalylar) is a village and municipality in the Fuzuli District of Azerbaijan. It has a population of 1,626.

References 

Populated places in Fuzuli District